Daxin is a town under the administration of Xingqing District, Yinchuan, Ningxia, China. , it has 12 residential communities and six villages under its administration:
Jufengyuan Community
Dongchengrenjia Community
Yinheng Community
Yanxiang Community
Yongtai Community
Xin'an Community
Yanqingyuan Community
Yinyanyuan Community
Yanxinyuan Community
Yanxiangyuan Community
Yanleyuan Community
Yanyiyuan Community
Daxin Village
Shangqiancheng Village
Taqiao Village
Yange Village
Xinqushao Village
Xinshuiqiao Village

References 

Township-level divisions of Ningxia
Yinchuan